The 2017 TVB Star Awards Malaysia, presented by TVB Entertainment News, Astro, MY FM, and MELODY FM in Malaysia, is an awards ceremony that recognises the best Hong Kong TVB television programmes that aired on Malaysia's Astro On Demand and Astro Wah Lai Toi in 2017. It was held on 25 November 2017 at the Arena of Stars, Genting Highlands in Kuala Lumpur, Malaysia, and was broadcast live through Malaysia's Astro Wah Lai Toi, Hong Kong's TVB Jade, and TVB Entertainment News . The ceremony was hosted by Carol Cheng, FAMA, Mayanne Mak, Luk Ho-ming, and Jarvis Chow.

Winners and nominees
The winners included Legal Mavericks and Michael Miu for his role as Inspector Cheuk Hoi in Line Walker: The Prelude.

Programs

Acting and hosting

References

External links
Official Instagram

TVB original programming
2017 television awards
2017 in Hong Kong television